Mudiah - Luxin  is a Syrian village located in Al-Janudiyah Nahiyah in Jisr al-Shughur District, Idlib.  According to the Syria Central Bureau of Statistics (CBS), Mudiah - Luxin had a population of 350 in the 2004 census.

References 

Populated places in Jisr al-Shughur District